Bays is a surname. Notable people with the surname include:

Carter Bays (born 1975), American television writer
Daniel H. Bays (1942–2019), American historian of China
Jan Chozen Bays (born 1945), American pediatrician and Buddhist writer
Steve Bays, Canadian musician, audio engineer, and producer